Events from the year 1996 in North Korea.

Incumbents
Premier: Kang Song-san 
Supreme Leader: Kim Jong-il

Events
1994~1998:Arduous March
April 1996: Several hundred armed North Korean troops cross repeatedly into the Demilitarized Zone.
May 1996: Seven Northern soldiers cross south of the Demilitarized Zone, but withdraw after warning shots are fired.
May & June 1996: North Korean vessels twice cross the Northern Limit Line and have a several-hour standoff with the South Korean navy.

References

 
North Korea
1990s in North Korea
Years of the 20th century in North Korea
North Korea